Aggeliki Kalaitzi (born c. 1984) is a Greek model and beauty pageant contestant who was crowned Miss Hellas 2008. She represented Greece at the Miss World 2008 pageant.

References

1980s births
Living people
Miss World 2008 delegates
Greek beauty pageant winners
Greek female models
People from Polygyros